Hapoel Rishon LeZion F.C. is an Israeli football club based in the city of Rishon LeZion, which currently plays  in Liga Leumit, Israel's  second football division. Home matches are hosted at the Haberfeld Stadium. In 1991, the club changed its name to Hapoel Ironi Rishon LeZion, and in June 2008 the name was switched back to Hapoel Rishon LeZion following a change in ownership.

History
Hapoel Rishon LeZion was one of the first clubs in the history of league football in Israel. The football section of the Sports club was established in 1929, and played several matches since 1933, including competing at the Palestine Cup in 1937 and 1939. The club was formally established in 1940.

Its best achievements were runner-up of the Israel State Cup in 1946 and 1996. On both occasions it lost to Maccabi Tel Aviv. Following its cup final in 1996, it played in UEFA Cup Winners' Cup, but was eliminated in the qualifying round by Constructorul Chisinau of Moldova on away goals rule (0–1, 3–2).

The club played at the top division in Mandatory Palestine for the first time at the 1941–42 season and after the Israeli Declaration of Independence, became founder members of the Israeli League in 1949. In 1951–52, the club finished second bottom and dropped to the second tier.

Between 1952 and 1994 the club played just three seasons in the top division: 1978–79, 1980–81 (where they finished sixth) and 1981–82. In the 1991–92 season, while playing in Liga Alef, the third tier, it added the word Ironi to its name, and in the next two seasons, made two successive promotions and returned to the top flight once again after winning Liga Artzit in the 1993–94 season. This time the club managed to stay nine consecutive seasons in the top league until it was relegated to the second tier, (Liga Leumit), at the end of the 2002–03 season, and three seasons later dropped further down to Liga Artzit, the third tier at the time.

In 2008–09, after the club changed its name back to Hapoel Rishon LeZion, it was promoted to the second tier (Known as Liga Leumit) .

In 2010–11, the club was promoted to the Israeli Premier League, the top tier. They were relegated back to Liga Leumit the following season.

On 4 December 2012, Hapoel Rishon LeZion won the 2012–13 Toto Cup Leumit.

In 2017–18, the club was just one point short of being promoted to the top tier, The Israeli Premier League, finishing third. In the following year, 2018–19, the club finished twelfth, and narrowly avoided relegation.

Current squad
 As to 31 January 2023

International former players
Europe
  Sejad Halilović (had one cap for croatia before Bosnia got their independence)
  Yevgeni Kashentsev
  Gennadi Tumilovich
  Ivan Yaremchuk
  Marc Van Der Linden
  Dean Racunica
  Gábor Márton
  Tomasz Cebula
  Karol Schulz
Africa
  Paul Akouokou
  Patrick Ovie
  Emmanuel Samadia
Central and North America
  Matan Peleg
Israel
  Rami Gershon
  Omer Atzili
  Baruch Dego
  Ya'akov Hodorov
  Shay Holtzman
  Eyal Ben Ami
  Itamar Shviro

Managers

 Eli Cohen (born 1951)
 Arik Gilrovich (2008–09)
 Nissan Yehezkel (2010–12)
 Eyal Lahman (2012–13)
 Sharon Mimer (2013–15)
 Ofir Haim (2015–16)
 Gili Levanda (2016)
 Nir Berkovic (2016–2018)
 Ron Marcus (2018–2019)
 Nir Berkovic (2019)
 Ofer Taselpapa (2019–2020)
 Meni Koretski (2020)
 Ismaeel Amar (2020–2022)
 Amir Nussbaum (2022–)

Honours

League

Cups

European Record

References

External links

 Official Site
  fans Official Site

 
Rishon Lezion
Rishon Lezion
Association football clubs established in 1940
1940 establishments in Mandatory Palestine
Hapoel Rishon LeZion F.C.